Liochlaena is a genus of liverworts belonging to the family Jungermanniaceae.

The species of this genus are found in Eurasia and Northern America.

Species:
 Liochlaena laetevirens Spruce 
 Liochlaena lanceolata Nees

References

Jungermanniales
Jungermanniales genera